Something Else is the seventh studio album by Irish alternative rock band The Cranberries, released on 28 April 2017, through BMG. The album, which features "unplugged" and orchestral versions of ten previously released singles and three new songs, was recorded at the Irish Chamber Orchestra Building, the University of Limerick, Ireland. The album cover is a re-enactment of the front cover image of the band's 1994 album No Need to Argue with the four members each in very similar positions. The backdrop, however, is a darker green as opposed to No Need to Argue'''s stark white and the band is sitting on a different sofa.

The lead single from the album, an acoustic version of the band's 1993 hit "Linger", was released on 16 March 2017. The same day, "Why?" was also released.Something Else is the band's final album released during lead singer Dolores O'Riordan's lifetime.

Critical receptionSomething Else received mostly positive reviews from music critics. Neil Z. Yeung of AllMusic rated the album four out of five stars and states, "Something Else is worthwhile for the faithful, offering new spins on songs that they likely know by heart, and is an easily digestible snapshot of their 20th century output for those in need of a reminder of the beloved Limerick group's legacy."

Matt the Raven of Under the Radar viewed that it presents Something Else'' in two styles,

Track listing
Writing credits adapted from BMI and ASCAP

Charts

Release history

References

The Cranberries albums
2017 albums
BMG Rights Management albums
Irish Chamber Orchestra albums
University of Limerick